Seeloo, also known as Seelu, is a small village in Baramulla district, Jammu and Kashmir, India. The village is situated on the Srinagar-Kupwara national highway and is located on the banks of the Pohru River. Seeloo is made up of the mohallas, Al-umar, Salfia Colony, Sidiq Colony, Hanjipora, Naikpora, Tilwanpora A, Tilwanpora B, Bhat Mohala, and Hajam Mohalla. According to the Indian Census of 2011, the population of Seeloo is 4,400.

Facilities 
Seeloo is Centre of almost fifteen villages.
The village has a relatively large market, power station, allopathic and homoeopathic public health centre, Cricket ground and a fire and emergency service station. 

As of 2016, a business unit of Jammu and Kashmir Bank (including an ATM) and a branch of Baramulla Central Cooperative bank operated there.

Seeloo is business hub in the area and has various business sectors viz: Automobile sector, Electric sector, restaurants and has all types of shops.

Education 
Seeloo has a Government Boys Middle School, Government Girls Middle School and a Government High School as well as some private schools, namely Shah Faisal Memorial school, Rehmat-e-Aalam Educational Trust Seelu . Apart from this, Seeloo has some welfare committees, and they are;  Human Welfare Organization (Bait ul Maal) and Aufaaq Board and Civil Society Seeloo.

This village has produced a  lot of talented professionals e.g.; Doctors, IT professional, Professors, Researchers, engineers etc. Some of them are working in other countries like USA, Middle East.

References

 sP 9906967961

Villages in Baramulla district
Sopore